Peter Frederick Rothermel (July 8, 1812 – August 15, 1895) was an American painter.

Biography
Rothermel was born in Nescopeck, Pennsylvania on July 8, 1812, although various sources give his birth year as 1813, 1814, and 1817. The artist's gravestone in Philadelphia gives the date as 1812.  He had a common-school education, and studied land surveying.  At age 20, he moved to Philadelphia and became a sign painter. Then at age 22, he took up the study of art. He was instructed in drawing by John Rubens Smith, and subsequently became a pupil of Bass Otis in Philadelphia.

His 1844 work De Soto discovering the Mississippi was purchased by the Art Union and marked his first success as an artist.  He served as vice president of the Artists' Fund Society in 1844 and as director of the Pennsylvania Academy of Fine Arts from 1847 to 1855.

During 1856-1859 he was in Europe, residing for about two years in Rome, and visiting also the principal cities in England, France, Germany, Belgium, and Italy. On his return to the United States, he returned to Philadelphia and was elected a member of the Pennsylvania Academy of Fine Arts, where he also taught notable artists of that era, including Charles Lewis Fussell.

He specialized in portraits and dramatic historical paintings. His most famous paintings include Patrick Henry before the Virginia House of Burgesses (1852) and a massive oil painting of the Battle of Gettysburg (finished in 1871) that hangs in the State Museum of Pennsylvania. This latter work was commissioned by Gettysburg lawyer David McConaughy. Another of his more popular historical works is Columbus Before the Queen, painted in 1844. He was elected as a member to the American Philosophical Society in 1873.

In 1877, he from Philadelphia to “Grassmere,” his country near Linfield, Pennsylvania, where he resided until his death. His estate still exists today on Limerick Center Road; it is now a residential site. Rothermel's son, Peter F. Rothermel, Jr., was District Attorney of Philadelphia.

Other works

Besides those mentioned, other works of Rothermel include:
 Christabel
 Katherine and Petruchio
 De Soto discovering the Mississippi (1844)
 Embarkation of Columbus
 Christian Martyrs in the Colisseum
 a series of paintings illustrative of William H. Prescott's History of the Conquest of Mexico (about 1850)
 The Virtuoso (1855)
 Vandyke and Rubens (1856)
 King Lear (1856)
 St. Agnes (1858)
 Paul at Ephesus
 Paul before Agrippa
 St. Paul preaching on Mars Hill to the Athenians
 Trial of Sir Henry Vane
 The Landsknecht (1876)
 Bacchantes (1884)

Notes

References

External links

 Lehigh University webpage for Rothermel

1817 births
1895 deaths
19th-century American painters
19th-century American male artists
American male painters
19th-century painters of historical subjects
Painters from Pennsylvania
Pennsylvania Academy of the Fine Arts faculty